The white warehou, Seriolella caerulea, is a medusafish of the family Centrolophidae found in the southern Pacific and southern Atlantic oceans, at depths of between 500 and 800 m.  Its length is up to about 75 cm.

References

 
 Tony Ayling & Geoffrey Cox, Collins Guide to the Sea Fishes of New Zealand, (William Collins Publishers Ltd, Auckland, New Zealand 1982) 

Centrolophidae
Fish described in 1848